

Codes

References

P